Mecca Leisure Group (also known as Mecca Leisure Ltd, Mecca Ltd, and Mecca Dance Ltd) was a British business that ran nightclubs, hotels, theme parks, bingo parlours and Hard Rock Cafes. During the 1960s, Mecca was a centre of entertainment with numerous nightclubs throughout major United Kingdom towns and cities. Mecca ballrooms were used for the BBC TV show Come Dancing. Eric Morley was a general manager of dancing at Mecca Leisure Group and was involved in the Miss World competitions.

Notable DJs performing at Mecca nightclubs include Jimmy Savile from 1960 and Pete Waterman.

The Coventry Locarno is the subject of the Specials song "Friday Night, Saturday Morning", B-side to Ghost Town. Chuck Berry's live version of "My Ding-a-Ling" was also recorded there.

History 
The Mecca Leisure Group has its origins in the Mecca Agency Limited, a company co-founded by Carl L. Heimann and Byron Davies in 1933 to operate the recently created dance hall chain Mecca Dancing.

In 1989, the company acquired Pleasurama plc.

In 1990, the Rank Organisation made an offer of £512m to acquire Mecca Leisure Group, which was initially rejected, and then accepted two months later.

Venues

References

External links 
 meccadancing.com

Leisure companies of the United Kingdom
Gambling companies of the United Kingdom